You Can Dance is the first remix album by American singer and songwriter Madonna. It was released on November 17, 1987, by Sire Records. The album contains remixes of tracks from her first three studio albums—Madonna (1983), Like a Virgin (1984) and True Blue (1986)—and a new track, "Spotlight". In the 1980s, remixing was still a new concept and technology, by which a particular vocal phrase could be endlessly copied, repeated, chopped up, transposed up and down in pitch and give them more echo, reverberation, treble or bass. Madonna became interested in the concept, noting that she hated when others remixed her songs and wanted to do it by herself.

Madonna turned to her old friend and producer John "Jellybean" Benitez to help her remix the songs, and also enlisted the help of Patrick Leonard, the producer of True Blue. The mixes on You Can Dance exhibited a number of typical mixing techniques. Instrumental passages were lengthened to increase the time for dancing, which undermined the tighter structure of the original pop song. Vocal phrases were repeated and subjected to multiple echoes, panned across the stereophonic sound outlets. At certain points, almost no music is heard except the drums and at other times, the drums are removed with only the hi-hat left to keep time. The album cover denoted Madonna's continuous fascination with Hispanic culture.

After its release, You Can Dance received generally positive reviews from critics, some of whom noted how the already known songs appeared to them in a complete new structure, calling it an essential album to be played at parties. You Can Dance was a commercial success, earning a platinum certification from the Recording Industry Association of America (RIAA) for shipment of a million copies, and reaching the top twenty of the Billboard 200. It reached the top ten of the album charts of France, Japan, Netherlands, New Zealand, Norway and the United Kingdom, and went on to sell five million copies worldwide, making it the second best-selling remix album of all time, behind only Blood on the Dance Floor from Michael Jackson. "Spotlight" was the only single released from the album in Japan, but charted on the airplay charts of Billboard due to radio play and peaked at number 32. You Can Dance has been credited for setting the standard of the remix albums afterward both in terms of concept and commercial success in record charts.

Background
In October 1986, Sire Records made the announce of the EP of 6-cuts called You Can Dance to be released a month or so before Christmas of that year. However, the idea was postponed a month later and held up until a full 12 months by the new singles to be released from her album True Blue (1986). In November 1987, Warner Bros. Records commissioned the release of You Can Dance—Madonna's first retrospective—which was aimed at the dance segment of her audience. It was an album containing seven of Madonna's songs in remixed format, which was still a revolutionary concept in the 1980s. By the mid-eighties, post-disco dance music was extremely popular and the concept of remix was widely regarded as a new direction of music. Several artists were remixing their tracks and compiling them to create new albums. Mixing was an interpretative process, where the artist was usually involved, but the development was generally looked after the record producer. The different parts of a song, including the lead vocals, background vocals, guitars, bass, synths, drum machine—all went through the process of mixing to sound considerably different from their original counterpart. Mixing determined how loud these instruments were going to sound in relation to each other and what particular sound effects should be added to each instrument. Improvements in studio technologies meant the possibility of shaping the sound of a song in any way, after it has been recorded. The arrangements were itself created at the mixing stage, rather than being created previously. A particular vocal phrase could be endlessly copied, repeated, chopped up, transposed up and down in pitch and give them more echo, reverberation, treble or bass.

It was this concept which intrigued Madonna, while she was developing her third studio album True Blue. She said, "I hate it when people do master mixes of my records. I don't want to hear my songs changed like that. I don't know that I like it, people screwing with my records. The jury is out on it for me. But the fans like it, and really, this one was for the fans, for the kids in the clubs who wanted to hear these songs in a fresh new way." She went to Warner with the idea of releasing her songs by remixing them in a complete dance tune. From Warner's point of view, the rise of remix was a commercial boon, because it meant making more money out of the same piece of music. Instead of paying Madonna to go to studio and record different tracks, they found that allowing her to record the same tracks in different formats was much less costly. Hence they decided to release the album, but gave full freedom to Madonna to choose the producers with whom she wanted to develop the remixes.

Development

Madonna turned to her old friend and producer John "Jellybean" Benitez to help her remixing the songs, and also enlisted the help of Patrick Leonard, the producer of True Blue. Together they chose six of Madonna's old songs and decided to give it a remixed form. The songs chosen were "Holiday", "Everybody" and "Physical Attraction" from Madonna (1983), "Into the Groove" and "Over and Over" from Like a Virgin (1984), and lastly, "Where's the Party" from True Blue. Along with the pre-released tracks, a never-before released song called "Spotlight" was included as a bonus. Madonna said that she was inspired by the song "Everybody Is a Star" (1970), by American rock band Sly and the Family Stone. Written by Madonna, Stephen Bray and Curtis Hudson, "Spotlight" was originally recorded during the True Blue recording sessions. It was omitted from the album because Madonna felt that it was similar in composition and structure to "Holiday".

After the remixing of the songs started, Benitez noted, "We decided on basic questions like 'How loud should the drums be? How much should the vocals stand out?' These are creative decisions which will change the finished piece of music." Shep Pettibone, one of the producers of the album commented that "normally, without some music to work on, the remixer has nothing. But we already had Madonna's catalogue of danceable songs which was enough material for lifetime." The mixes on You Can Dance exhibited a number of typical mixing techniques. Instrumental passages were lengthened to increase the time for dancing, which undermined the tighter structure of the original pop song. Vocal phrases were repeated and subjected to multiple echoes, panned across the stereophonic sound outlets. At certain points, almost no music is heard except the drums and at others, the drums are removed with only the hi-hat left to keep time.

The album cover denoted Madonna's continued fascination with Spanish culture and fashion. She wore a female toreador outfit with a lacy bustier, embroidered bolero jacket and a cummerbund with a flouncy bustle. Jeri Heiden, who had worked on the cover art for True Blue, was given the task of editing the photos and making them compatible for appearance in an album cover. Shot by Herb Ritts, the cover showed Madonna again as a platinum blonde. Heiden explained in an interview with Aperture magazine in October 2006 that the cover was not meant to be a tie-in with the True Blue cover. "It was just Madonna's look at the time – Platinum Blonde. And of course the handwriting reappears on that album." The album sleeve included a free poster and the gold wrap-around liner notes contained approximate running time to indicate the difference between the length of the remix and the original track. Brian Chin, a Rolling Stone journalist, wrote the liner notes for the album, explaining the process of remix and why the seven songs were chosen for the track list.

Composition

According to Rikky Rooksby, author of The Complete Guide to the Music of Madonna, "Improvements in studio technology meant that possibilities for shaping the sound after it has been recorded are almost limitless." Such possibility were applied in the song composition and the remixes present in You Can Dance. Previously to change the sound of an instrument, or to jump from one sound to another, recordings used to stop playing the instrument and the drums at that point. But for the remixes on You Can Dance, the fade engineering technology was applied to the songs, wherein the fader was simply pulled down, and was pushed up again when the sound of the instruments were made to come up to the surface. The first song on the album is "Spotlight" which begins with the sound of drums, bass synths and handclaps, followed by Madonna uttering the words "Spotlight, shine bright". After the first verse, the sound of keyboard is heard during the chorus. It continues like this through the second verse, which is followed by an interlude featuring vocal echoes, a piano segment and violin phrases. Madonna follows the music played by the piano and utters the words "Pa-da-pa-da-pappa pappa pa pa" in the same melody. The lyrics deal with Madonna making the listener remember that "everybody is a star" and that if one wants to be famous and be under the "spotlight", the person should sing about it and reality may catch up with him or her. According to the sheet music for the song, is set in the time signature of common time, with a tempo of 100 beats per minute. It is set in the key of F major with Madonna's voice spanning from the notes of C5 to B5. "Spotlight" has a basic sequence of Am–C–Am–C–G–F as its chord progression.

The second track is "Holiday", which Benitez said that he always wanted to remix, commenting "There are new sounds on the 1987 remix [of 'Holiday'], but it had a groove that needed no improvement." The sound of the guitar is brought to the front in the remix, with a piano break and a middle section consisting of drum beats. The mix for "Everybody" starts with four repetitions of the vocal hook and then moves into a rhythm centered arrangement. Like "Holiday", the middle section of "Everybody" features a drum break, with a synth tune backing it up. The word "dance" is echoed and slowed-down continuously through the break, gradually changing into the intermedia verse. At the very end, the drums are pulled out, leaving Madonna repeating the "get up and do your thing" phrase, which hovers over to the intro of the next song "Physical Attraction". In the "Into the Groove" remix, overdubs are present with the continuous repetition of the phrase "c'mon". The first verse does not start until about ninety seconds into the remix. After the first "Now I know you're mine" line is sung, there is a percussion break, and repetition of the phrases "step to the beat" and "c'mon". The last verse incorporates echoing on the vocals, causing overlap of the phrases. The remix ends with instrumentation from congas, whistles and timbales, giving it a Mexican ending.

Critical reception

Stephen Thomas Erlewine from AllMusic said that "[You Can Dance] keeps the spotlight on her first record, adding non-LP singles like 'Into the Groove' for good measure, along with a bonus track of 'Where's the Party'. Since it is a dance album, it doesn't matter that 'Holiday' and 'Into the Groove' are here twice, once each in dub versions, because the essential grooves and music are quite different in each incarnation. It is true that some of this now sounds dated—these are quite clearly extended mixes from the mid 80s—but that's part of its charm, and it all holds together quite well. Not essential, but fun." In The Village Voice, Robert Christgau considered that "the effects, repeats, breaks, and segues added by a star crew of remixers [...] amount to new music—this time the songs don't surface, they reach out and grab you". He also argued that You Can Dance reminded the audience that before MTV, they "loved the way she sounded". Author J. Randy Taraborrelli noted that "You Can Dance made one point clear about Madonna. While she was evolving into a serious pop star, musically she still knew how to host the best party." He complimented the remixed versions of "Holiday", "Everybody", "Physical Attraction" and "Into the Groove". Writing for About.com, Bill Lamb called it "another outstanding greatest hits collection" from Madonna's discography.

Timothy Green from The Miami Herald said that "[The album has] got a good beat and you can dance to it. Madonna's new album isn't really new, but rather a collection of danceable hits, remixed by club deejays masterful at that peculiar art of taking the artists' work, track by track, and reconstructing it. Most such remixes become 12-inch dance singles, and You Can Dance, is basically a compilation of these. The remixes sound fresh and gives a new outlook on the already famous and popular songs." However, Daniel Brogan from the same newspaper praised the album, saying that "Madonna has brought a new joy to the people buying gifts for Christmas, as You Can Dance is a fun-filled, fast-paced retrospective that will burn the dance floor till New Year." Richard Harrington from The Washington Post called the album "an energetic collection of extended dance remixes, that will surely be the highlight of the party crowds flocking around the town." John Milward from USA Today felt that "although the remixes sound a little exhaustive, its nevertheless party time with Madonna's album." Jan DeKnock from the Chicago Tribune was not impressed with the album, calling it calculative.

Commercial performance
In the United States, the album was released on November 18, 1987, and reached a peak of number 14 on the Billboard 200. The LP cuts debuted at number 41 on the Dance Music/Club Play chart, and moved up to number 17 the next week.  The LP cuts ultimately topped the Dance chart, becoming Madonna's seventh number one entry. The album was certified Platinum by the Recording Industry Association of America (RIAA) for shipment of one million copies across the United States.

In Canada, the album debuted at number 55 on the RPM Albums Chart on December 5, 1987. After five weeks, it reached a peak of number 11 on the chart. It was present for a total of 21 weeks on the chart. In Australia, You Can Dance debuted at number 15 on the Kent Music Report albums chart, and peaked at number 13. It was certified platinum by the Australian Recording Industry Association (ARIA) for shipment of 70,000 copies of the album. You Can Dance reached a peak of number four in New Zealand.

In the United Kingdom, You Can Dance was released on November 28, 1987, and entered the UK Albums Chart and peaked at number five. It was Madonna's fifth top-ten album there present for a total of 16 weeks on the chart, and was certified platinum by the British Phonographic Industry (BPI) for shipment of 300,000 copies of the album. The album re-entered the chart at number 69, on March 4, 1995, after being released in mid-price in the United Kingdom. Across Europe, the album reached number three on the European Top 100 Albums chart, and the top five in Norway and Netherlands, while charting within the top twenty of Austria, Germany, Spain, Sweden and Switzerland. You Can Dance also reached number two in France. Worldwide, it went on to sell five million copies, becoming the second best-selling remix album of all time.

Promotion
"Spotlight" was released as the only single from the album in Japan on April 25, 1988. It was not officially released as a single in the United States; therefore it was not eligible at the time to appear on Billboards Hot 100. Even so, it managed to garner enough airplay to appear on the publication's Hot 100 Airplay survey in early 1988. It debuted on the Airplay chart at 37 on the issue dated January 16, 1988. After three weeks, "Spotlight" reached a peak of 32, but fell to 40 the next week before exiting the chart. It had also reached the Hot Crossover 30 chart beginning on the issue dated December 12, 1987, peaking at 15 for two consecutive weeks beginning January 9, 1988 and spending eight total weeks on the chart. The song was released commercially in Japan on April 25, 1988. "Spotlight" peaked at number 68 on the Oricon weekly singles chart, remaining on the chart for five weeks. It also charted on the Oricon international singles chart, reaching a peak of three on May 19, 1988, staying on the chart for ten weeks.

Legacy

Jon O'Brien from Billboard commented that Madonna became "the first major pop artist" to release a hits collection with its extended 12" versions. You Can Dance is one of the first sets of remixes to be conceived as a full-length album. Shortly after its release, Madonna was called "the most important dance artist" by a number of media outlets, and described by the pan-European magazine Music & Media as "the world's most successful artist in bridging the dance and pop audiences".

Matthew Rettenmund author of Encyclopedia Madonnica (1995), praised her first retrospective record because, rather than releasing a greatest-hits album, her first compilation was a "groundbreaking remix album". The entire concept of copying, repeating, pasting and playing was still in its "infancy" when Madonna released this project. Writing for Reader's Digest, Jon O'Brien stated "Madge was the first genuine superstar to realise the power of the DJ". Biographer David James commented that "Madonna broke fresh ground". Daryl Easlea, in Madonna: Blonde ambition (2012) wrote that what was particularly successful about You Can Dance, was the way the tracks were mixed into a continuous segue, further asserting that "it was very much a forerunner of today's club mixes" and that this had been happening in clubs for years, "but Madonna once again popularized a breaking wave by capturing it on vinyl".

J. Randy Taraborrelli credits Madonna for being part of jump-started the trend of releasing remix albums. According to O'Brien, Madonna "inspired generations of pop artists to rework their bops for club dance floors". Steffanee Wang from Nylon has noted its influence on Club Future Nostalgia by Dua Lipa. Shortly after the release of You Can Dance, major acts of the day were following suit with their own, including Bobby Brown's Dance!...Ya Know It!, New Kids on the Block's No More Games/The Remix Album, Jody Watley's You Wanna Dance with Me? and Paula Abdul's Shut Up and Dance: Mixes contributing to the perception that dance remix albums weren't viewed as "rarities". Kelefa Sanneh in Major Labels: A History of Popular Music in Seven Genres (2021) describes how she "released a type of record that many of her fans had probably never previously encountered". Despite this, according to biographer Michelle Morgan, the album was well-received by fans.

The influence of You Can Dance as a remix album on record charts was also commented on. Rob Copsey from the Official Charts Company stated that You Can Dance "set the bar for how it should be done". Easlea wrote that while the record missed out on the US Top Ten, it still managed to sell more than a million copies—"no mean feat" for a material that had "largely been previously released elsewhere". Its worldwide results led to it becoming the best-selling remix album for nearly ten years until the release of Blood on the Dance Floor: HIStory in the Mix by Michael Jackson.

Recognition
According to Wang, You Can Dance is one of the first major remix albums in pop music. To O'Brien, the album is among her "groundbreaking" records, along with the likes of Like a Prayer and Ray of Light. Music critic Robert Christgau called both You Can Dance and The Immaculate Collection "stunning" records, while the staff of Rolling Stone called both compilations "perfect Madonna CD[s]".

You Can Dance made appearances on a number of year-end and best-of lists. Upon its release, the record was chosen as "album of the week" by Music & Media, issued on November 28, 1987. The same publication named it "The Dance Record of the Year". Lucinda Prince of the Australian website Cool Accident listed the compilation as one of the "Best 5 Pop Remix Albums".

Track listing

Personnel
Credits adapted as per the You Can Dance LP liner notes.

Madonna – vocals
Michael Barbiero – remixing, additional production
 John "Jellybean" Benitez – sequencing, remixing, additional production
 Stephen Bray – producer (previously unreleased track)
 Bruce Forest – remixing, additional production
 Frank Heller – remixing, additional production
 Michael Ostin – executive producer
 Shep Pettibone – editing, remixing, additional production
 Steve Thompson – remixing, additional production
 David Cole – keyboard
 Glenn Rosenstein – sound engineer
 Michael Hutchinson – remixing, additional production
 Jeri Heiden – art direction, cover art design
Herb Ritts – cover art photographer
Brian Chin – liner notes

Charts

Weekly charts

Year-end charts

Certifications and sales

Notes

See also
 List of number-one dance singles of 1988 (U.S.)

References

Book sources

External links

1987 remix albums
Madonna remix albums
Sire Records remix albums
Warner Records remix albums